Walter Owen is the name of:

 Walter Owen (1884-1963), Scottish translator, known for his work in Argentina
 Walter C. Owen (1868-1934), American jurist and politician
 Walter Richard Owen (1880-1959), British politician
 Walter Stewart Owen (1904-1981), Canadian Lieutenant Governor

See also
 Walter Owens
 Owen Walter